Prost AP05 was the car Formula 1 car built by Prost, which was to be used in the 2002 season. It never took part in a race.

History 
The Prost AP05 was built on a 50% scale and was tested in a wind tunnel. On December 9, 2001, Alain Prost announced that the car might not be ready for race one with the plan to start the season with the Prost AP04 and the launch of the AP05 at the start of the European leg of the season. Prost announced that the new car will be a big step forward, but it may not be as reliable as the previous design. Soon the team lost finances and pulled out of Formula 1.

References

Prost Formula One cars
Formula One cars that never raced